The women's moguls competition of the 2015 Winter Universiade was held at Visera slope, Sierra Nevada, Spain on February 5, 2015.

The qualification round were cancelled due to bad weather conditions.

Results

References 

Women's moguls